JejeMom is a 2010 Philippine television situational comedy series broadcast by GMA Network. Directed by Dominic Zapata, it stars Eugene Domingo in the title role. It premiered on August 14, 2010 replacing Claudine. The series concluded on November 13, 2010 with a total of 14 episodes.

Cast and characters

Lead cast
Eugene Domingo as Gigi dela Cruz / Stephanie Jones

Supporting cast
Jennica Garcia as Lovely dela Cruz / Pamela Jones
Chariz Solomon as Yasmin Villafuerte
Wendell Ramos as Dindo Arañes / Dindo Jones
Robert "Buboy" Villar as G-Boy dela Cruz / Sander Jones
Gelli de Belen as Bunny Wilson
Ricky Davao as Winston Wilson / Lady Gangstah
Carl Guevarra as Jhong Jilaro
Bayani Agbayani as Hepe D. Marangya
Barbie Forteza as Angelene "Angel" Arevalo
Sandy Talag as Tweety Wilson

Ratings
According to AGB Nielsen Philippines' Mega Manila People/Individual television ratings, the pilot episode of JejeMom earned a 9% rating. While the final episode scored an 8% rating.

Accolades

References

External links
 

2010 Philippine television series debuts
2010 Philippine television series endings
Filipino-language television shows
GMA Network original programming
Philippine comedy television series
Television shows set in the Philippines